Michigan-Lee Apartments is a historic apartment building at 940-950 Michigan Avenue in Evanston, Illinois. The three-story brick building was built in 1928. Architect Frank W. Cauley, who also designed Evanston's Orrington Hotel, designed the building in the Georgian Revival style. The building features entrances flanked by columns, limestone quoins, and a parapet with decorative urns. A sunken courtyard occupies the center of the building; while courtyards were common in Evanston's apartments, the sunken design is unusual within the city.

The building was added to the National Register of Historic Places on March 15, 1984.

References

Buildings and structures on the National Register of Historic Places in Cook County, Illinois
Residential buildings on the National Register of Historic Places in Illinois
Buildings and structures in Evanston, Illinois
Apartment buildings in Illinois
Residential buildings completed in 1928
Georgian Revival architecture in Illinois